The Kiss×sis manga, written and illustrated by Bow Ditama, is a seinen publication that premiered as a one-shot in the January 2004 issue of Bessatsu Young Magazine, a bimonthly periodical circulated by Kodansha. The story, a comedic slice of life, centers on Keita Suminoe, a fifteen-year-old middle-turn-high school student who is the frequent subject of his sixteen-year-old stepsisters' romantic attention.

After being met with largely positive reception from readers, the manga was given regular syndication in December 2005, going on to become a monthly series when Kodansha changed the frequency of its magazine, renamed Monthly Young Magazine, on December 9, 2009. News of work to redevelop Kiss×sis into an animated series first surfaced in the June 2008 issue of Bessatsu Young Magazine; since then, the series has been made into a twelve-episode anime television series broadcast on AT-X from April 5 to June 21, 2010, and a direct-to-video (OVA) release started December 22, 2008, both animated by Feel.

Kiss×sis was first collected into a volume on September 6, 2007, by Kodansha under their KC Deluxe imprint. Following the release of the second volume, limited edition bundles of the manga and direct-to-video releases of the anime began to be offered. In addition to its domestic release, the manga is also licensed for distribution in Taiwan by Sharp Point Press.

As of November 2021, 25 volumes have been released.


Volume list

References

External links
Official Kodansha Kiss×sis website 

Kissxsis
2004 manga